Pythonesque is a Monty Python-related play by the British playwright Roy Smiles. It is based on Python member Graham Chapman's battle with alcoholism and his death from cancer. It continues with his rise in comedy and his getting the lead in Monty Python and the Holy Grail (1975) and Monty Python's Life of Brian (1979).

It was first performed in South Africa in 2008 and made its British debut at the 2009 Edinburgh Fringe Festival where it starred Matt Addis as Terry Jones, and Michael Palin, James Lance as Terry Gilliam, Eric Idle, Mark Oosterveen as John Cleese, and Chris Polick as Graham Chapman.

It was later adapted for BBC Radio 4 with the same cast and broadcast as the Afternoon Play, in September 2010.

References 

British plays
2008 plays
Plays based on real people
Cultural depictions of British men
Cultural depictions of comedians
Cultural depictions of actors
Plays set in England
Plays set in the 1970s
Plays set in the 1980s
Works about alcoholism
Works about cancer
Monty Python
Plays adapted into radio programs